Pellonyssus is a genus of bird mites in the family Macronyssidae. There are at least three described species in Pellonyssus.

Species
These three species belong to the genus Pellonyssus:
 Pellonyssus marui
 Pellonyssus passeri
 Pellonyssus reedi Zumpt & Patterson, 1952

References

Mesostigmata
Articles created by Qbugbot